Salaria basilisca is a species of combtooth blenny found in the Mediterranean Sea near Tunisia and Turkey, also in the Adriatic Sea.  This species reaches a length of  TL. It is found among seagrass, sometimes where there is a rocky substrate. The male guards the eggs produced by several females. They are protogynous hermaphrodites with individuals being females while young changing to males later.

References

basilisca
Fish described in 1836
Fish of the Mediterranean Sea
Fish of Europe
Fish of Western Asia
Fish of Africa